103 Aquarii is a single star in the equatorial constellation of Aquarius. 103 Aquarii is the Flamsteed designation, although it also bears the Bayer designation A1 Aquarii. It is faint but visible to the naked eye as an orange hued star with an apparent visual magnitude of 5.34. It is moving away from the Earth with a heliocentric radial velocity of +25 km/s.

This is classified as an K-type giant star, having evolved off the main sequence after exhausting the hydrogen at its core and expanded to 64 times the Sun's radius. The star is radiating 848 times the luminosity of the Sun from its enlarged photosphere at an effective temperature of 3,910 K.

References

External links
Aladin previewer, image 
Aladin sky atlas, image

K-type giants
Aquarius (constellation)
Aquarii, A1
BD-18 6357
Aquarii, 103
222547
116889
8980